Apoctena conditana is a species of moth of the  family Tortricidae. It is found in New Zealand, where it is found on both the North and South islands.

The larvae are polyphagous.

References

Moths described in 1863
Epitymbiini
Moths of New Zealand